William III  (died October 1129) was the Count of Forcalquier and Marquis of Provence from 1094. He was the second son of Count Ermengol IV of Urgell and Adelaide of Forcalquier, heiress of Count William Bertrand of Provence.

Sometime between 1076 and 1080, William married Gersende, daughter of Count Guigues III of Albon. They had two sons, Guigues and Bertrand I.

On the death of his father in 1092, he received a part of the parias (tribute) from the taifa of Zaragoza. His father's will, now lost, enjoined him and his brother Ermengol V, who inherited Urgell, to fight continuously against the Muslims.

William inherited a share of Provence (Forcalquier) on the death of his maternal grandfather in 1094. He died in Avignon.

Notes

Sources

Counts of Forcalquier
11th-century French people
12th-century French people
1129 deaths

Year of birth missing